Tereza Martincová (born 24 October 1994) is a Czech tennis player.

Martincová has won one doubles title on the WTA Tour and four singles titles on the ITF Circuit. On 14 February 2022, she reached her best WTA singles ranking of world No. 40. On 8 August 2022, she peaked at No. 77 in the WTA doubles rankings.

Career

2013–2015

In June 2013, Martincová made her WTA Tour main-draw debut at the Nürnberger Versicherungscup. After coming through all three qualifying rounds, she lost to Estrella Cabeza Candela in round one. One month later, Martincová once again came through qualifying at the Baku Cup, defeating Oksana Kalashnikova in the first round, but losing to Tadeja Majerič in the second.

In 2014, first WTA tournament for Martincová was the Nürnberger Versicherungscup, where she qualified for the main draw, and then lost to Anastasia Rodionova. She qualified for the Swedish Open in Båstad, before Mona Barthel defeated her in the first round. At the Coupe Banque Nationale in Quebec City, Martincová once again passed qualifying, but again lost in the first main-draw round, this time to Shelby Rogers.

In 2015, Martincová made her first WTA Tour quarterfinal at the Brasil Tennis Cup after victories over Quirine Lemoine and Ajla Tomljanović. She also made her Grand Slam debut at the US Open.

2016–20

In 2016, she improved her best performance on WTA Tour, making it to the semifinals of the Tournois de Québec, and earning victories over Barbora Krejčíková, Ekaterina Alexandrova and Jessica Pegula.

Martincová realized her best performance at a major championship in 2017, reaching the first round at the US Open by defeating Valentini Grammatikopoulou, Vera Lapko and Georgia Brescia in qualifying. She repeated her best performance on the WTA Tour, reaching the semifinals of the Ladies Championship Gstaad.

In 2018, she reached her second ITF Circuit final in doubles, playing alongside Michaëlla Krajicek.

She won her fourth ITF title in Essen, defeating Paula Badosa in the 2019 final. She achieved her best performance at Wimbledon, reaching the first round by defeating Xu Shilin, Caroline Dolehide and Anna Blinkova in qualifying. She also reached the first round of the US Open, repeating her best performance at this tournament, and third qualifying round at the Australian Open.

Her performances kept improving in 2020 when she repeated her best score in Melbourne, reaching last qualifying round. At the Qatar Open, she went through qualifying defeating Kristýna Plíšková and Misaki Doi. She reached the second round of the tournament by defeating Misaki Doi (playing as lucky loser) again, and then lost to Maria Sakkari. This was the first time, she reached the main draw of a Premier-5 tournament.

2021–22: Top 100 in singles & doubles, first WTA final in singles & first title in doubles 

Qualified for Dubai, she reached the third round at a WTA-1000 event for the first time, defeating Kristýna Plíšková and world No. 11, Kiki Bertens.

After qualifying for another WTA-1000 event in Miami and making second round, where she pushed world No. 9 and eventual finalist, Bianca Andreescu, to a tiebreak in the first set, she made her top 100 singles debut.

Martincová scored her first Grand Slam tournament match-win at the French Open, defeating Ivana Jorović 6–3, 7–6. She then lost to 28th seeded Jessica Pegula, in straight sets.

Martincová started her grass-court season with quarterfinal showings in Nottingham and Birmingham, scoring big wins over former top-10 members and major champions, Samantha Stosur and Jelena Ostapenko. 

Entering Wimbledon in good form, she stormed into the third round on grandslam for the first time, defeating former quarterfinalist Alison Riske and Nadia Podoroska. Her run was ended by eventual finalist and compatriot Karolína Plíšková.

Martincová then reached her first WTA Tour final in Prague without dropping a set. She won just two games in the championship match against compatriot and French Open champion Barbora Krejčíková.

Entering the US Open unseeded, Martincová was swept aside in the first round by 18th seed Victoria Azarenka 4–6, 0–6, despite being 4–1 up in the first set.

Martincová reached her first WTA 500 level quarterfinal in Ostrava, defeating Kateřina Siniaková and Anastasia Pavlyuchenkova before losing to eventual finalist Maria Sakkari.

She ended season by losing a titanic battle at Kremlin Cup, losing 4–6, 6–4, 3–6 to world No. 6 and eventual 2021 WTA Finals champion, Garbiñe Muguruza, in the second round.

She made her top 50 debut in November, finishing year as world No. 48.

Martincová qualified into the Australian Open main draw for the first time. In the first round, she defeated Lauren Davis, before she lost to 30th seeded Camila Giorgi in the second.

She won just one singles match before entering the Australian Open, but she reached her first WTA doubles final at the Melbourne Summer Set 2 with Mayar Sherif, followed by another doubles final the following week at the Adelaide International 2 with Markéta Vondroušová, losing both in three sets. Martincová made her top 100 debut in doubles, after reaching the second round of the Australian Open with Vondroušová.

Endorsements
She is sponsored by Mizuno for her clothing and by Wilson for her racquets.

Performance timelines

Only main-draw results in WTA Tour, Grand Slam tournaments, Fed Cup/Billie Jean King Cup and Olympic Games are included in win–loss records.

Singles
Current through the 2023 Indian Wells Open.

Doubles
Current after the 2023 Australian Open.

WTA career finals

Singles: 1 (runner-up)

Doubles: 3 (1 title, 2 runner-ups)

ITF Circuit finals

Singles: 8 (4 titles, 4 runner–ups)

Doubles: 2 (2 runner–ups)

Record against other players

Record against top 10 players 

 She has a 1–11 record against players who were, at the time the match was played, ranked in the top 10.

Double bagel matches (6–0, 6–0)

Matches without dropping a single game

Notes

References

External links

 
 

1994 births
Living people
Czech female tennis players
Tennis players from Prague
21st-century Czech women